Deh Khinu (also Romanized as Deh Khīnū) is a village in Balvard Rural District, in the Central District of Sirjan County, Kerman Province, Iran. At the 2006 census, its population was 62, in 13 families.

References 

Populated places in Sirjan County